Las Vegas College was a for-profit college in Henderson, Nevada. In 2009 it became Everest College.

History
Founded in 1979 in Las Vegas by Betty Krolak under the name Krolak Business Institute, Barbara A. and E.T. Paulus purchased the Institute in December 1980 and incorporated it under the name of TO-Ba Corporation.

On January 7, 1986, the Institute was licensed to offer associate degrees and soon changed its name to Las Vegas Business College. It was acquired by Rhodes Colleges, Inc. on Oct 17, 1996 and was changed to Las Vegas College.

In 2003, the school opened a branch campus in Henderson, Nevada. In 2005, the main campus moved to the Henderson branch. On August 10, 2009 Las Vegas College became Everest College.

In February 2015, Zenith Education Group purchased the school from Corinthian Colleges. In August 2017, Everest College changed its name to Altierus Career College.

References

Former for-profit universities and colleges in the United States
Educational institutions established in 1979
Buildings and structures in Henderson, Nevada
1979 establishments in Nevada
Corinthian Colleges
Defunct private universities and colleges in Nevada